Fort Columbia State Park is a public recreation area and historic preserve at the site of former Fort Columbia, located on Chinook Point at the mouth of the Columbia River in Chinook, Washington. The  state park features twelve historic wood-frame fort buildings as well as an interpretive center and hiking trails. The park's grounds are located over a tunneled section of U.S. Route 101.

History
Fort Columbia was built from 1896 to 1904 to support the defense of the Columbia River. The fort was constructed on the Chinook Point promontory as part of a "triangle of fire" defensive strategy that included Fort Canby and Fort Stevens. Fort Columbia was declared surplus at the end of World War II and was transferred to the custody of the state of Washington in 1950.

In the 1960s and 1970s, Battery 246 was outfitted to serve as a Civil Defense Emergency Operating Center and was one of several possible locations the governor could use in an emergency. In 1993, the park received a pair of 6-inch guns that were transferred to Battery 246 from the former Fort McAndrew, Naval Station Argentia, Newfoundland, Canada.

Features

Exhibits at the Fort Columbia Interpretive Center focus on the fort's history, early explorers and pioneer history. The Commanding Officers Quarters is decorated with turn-of-the-century furnishings. The park grounds feature three artillery batteries and two coastal artillery guns. Two historic homes, the Steward's House and Scarborough House, are offered for rental. The park is one of several state parks and sites in Washington and Oregon that make up the Lewis and Clark National Historical Park.

References

External links

Fort Columbia State Park Washington State Parks and Recreation Commission

State parks of Washington (state)
Parks in Pacific County, Washington
Protected areas established in 1950
Columbia River
Columbia
Museums in Pacific County, Washington
Military and war museums in Washington (state)